The 1982 FIVB Women's World Championship was the ninth edition of the tournament, organised by the world's governing body, the FIVB. It was held from 12 to 25 September 1982 at six venues in six different cities in Peru. The finals were held at the Coliseo Amauta in Lima, Peru.

Qualification

Squads

Venues

Pools composition
The teams are seeded based on their final ranking at the 1978 FIVB Women's World Championship.

*: Withdrew and replaced by  junior team, its result did not count in the championship. 

Results

First round

Pool A
Location: Lima

|}

|}

Pool B
Location: Trujillo

|}

|}

Pool C
Location: Tacna

|}

|}

Pool D
Location: Ica

|}

|}

Pool E
Location: Arequipa

|}

|}

Pool F
Location: Chiclayo

|}

|}

Second round
The results and the points of the matches between the same teams that were already played during the first round are taken into account for the second round.

1st–12th pools

Pool G
Location: Lima

|}

|}

Pool H
Location: Trujillo

|}

|}

13th–23rd pools

Pool I
Location: Arequipa

|}

|}

Pool J
Location: Ica

|}

|}

Final round

21st–23rd places

21st–23rd semifinals

|}

21st place match

|}

17th–20th places

17th–20th semifinals

|}

19th place match

|}

17th place match

|}

13th–16th places

13th–16th semifinals

|}

15th place match

|}

13th place match

|}

9th–12th places

9th–12th semifinals

|}

11th place match

|}

9th place match

|}

5th–8th places

5th–8th semifinals

|}

7th place match

|}

5th place match

|}

Finals

Semifinals

|}

3rd place match

|}

Final

|}

Final standing

Awards

 Most Valuable Player
  Lang Ping

 Best Spiker
  Denisse Fajardo

References

External links
 Results
 Federation Internationale de Volleyball

W
V
FIVB Volleyball Women's World Championship
Sports competitions in Lima
Fivb Women's World Championship, 1982
Sports in Trujillo, Peru
September 1982 sports events in South America
1980s in Lima
Women's volleyball in Peru